Nagar taluka is a taluka in Ahmednagar subdivision of Ahmednagar district in Maharashtra State of India.

Area
The table below shows area of the taluka by land type.

Villages
There are around 117 villages in Nagar taluka. For list of villages see Villages in Nagar taluka.

Population
The table below shows a population  of the taluka by sex. The data is as per 2001 census.

Rain Fall
The Table below details of rainfall from year 1981 to 2004.

See also
 Talukas in Ahmednagar district
 Villages in Nagar taluka

References

Cities and towns in Ahmednagar district
Talukas in Ahmednagar district
Talukas in Maharashtra